Sergei Martynov (born 22 July 1965) is an archer from Kazakhstan.  Martynov represented Kazakhstan at the 1996 Summer Olympics competing in the men's team and men's individual events.

References

External links
 

1965 births
Living people
Kazakhstani male archers
Olympic archers of Kazakhstan
Archers at the 1996 Summer Olympics
Archers at the 1998 Asian Games
Asian Games competitors for Kazakhstan
20th-century Kazakhstani people